This could refer to:

Baraja (playing cards), a Spanish set of playing cards.
Rubén Baraja, a Spanish football (soccer) player.
Javier Baraja, a Spanish football (soccer) player.